Fosseux is a commune in the Pas-de-Calais department in the Hauts-de-France region of France.

Geography

Population

Places of interest
 The church of St.Nicholas, dating from the seventeenth century.
 The eighteenth-century chateau.
 Traces of an old castle.
 A 400-year-old tree.

See also
Communes of the Pas-de-Calais department

References

Communes of Pas-de-Calais